Shanni Hazrat Mahama is a Ghanaian politician and member of the first parliament of the second republic of Ghana representing Yendi constituency in the Northern Region of Ghana under the membership of the Progress Party (PP).

Early life and education 
Shanni was born on 1 October 1938 and lived in yendi a town in tamale in the Northern Region of Ghana, He was educated at Yendi Primary School in the year 1949 to 1952, He attended the Ahmadiyya Secondary School from 1954 to 1959, and the Katsina Teaching Training College from 1960 to 1961 when he obtained his Teachers' Training Certificate. He later worked as a teacher before going into Parliament.

Career 
He was a Teacher and Ministerial Secretary, Ministry of Agriculture.

Politics 
Mahama began his political career in 1969 when he became the parliamentary candidate for the Progress Party to represent Yendi constituency of the Northern Region of Ghana prior to the commencement of the 1969 Ghanaian parliamentary election.

He was sworn into the First Parliament of the Second Republic of Ghana on 1 October 1969, after being pronounced winner at the 1969 parliamentary election held on 26 August 1969. His tenure of office as a member of parliament ended on 13 January 1972.

Personal life 
Mahama is a Muslim.

References 

1938 births
Ghanaian MPs 1969–1972
T.I. Ahmadiyya Senior High School (Kumasi) alumni
Living people